The NS 3500 was a series of steam locomotives of the Dutch Railways (NS), which were acquired second-hand from the Swiss railways SBB.

After the Second World War, the NS urgently needed locomotives, as many locomotives had been destroyed or taken due to the war conditions. Among other things, 22 2'C (4-6-0) steam locomotives of the class A 3/5 603–649, which were withdrawn there, were taken over from the Swiss SBB.

The locomotives would actually be put into service as NS series 3651–3672, but because the last three locomotives of the NS 3500 series had been withdrawn shortly before, these locomotives were given the numbers 3501–3522. Between May and October 1946 they were taken in five locomotive convoys via France and Belgium to the Central Workshop of the NS in Tilburg. There were some adjustments made before they were put into service from June 1946 in unaltered black livery. The locomotives were allocated to Zwolle, Nijmegen, The Hague, Venlo and Zutphen depot. At the NS, they were nicknamed 'Goudvinken' (bullfinches) because of the narrow brass band around the chimney. But some locomotives were painted in NS green. After only a few years of service, the locomotives were withdrawn between 1948 and 1952.

History 
Between 1907 and 1915, the Swiss Lokomotiv- und Maschinenfabrik (SLM) delivered 47 locomotives to the Swiss Federal Railways (SBB). The locomotives were designated A 3/5 and were given the numbers 603–649. The SBB withdrew the locomotives from service between 1934 and 1946.

Gallery

Sources and references 

 H. Waldorp: Onze Nederlandse stoomlocomotieven in woord en beeld, (7e druk) uitgeverij De Alk, Alkmaar, 1986. .
 R.C. Statius Muller, A.J. Veenendaal jr., H. Waldorp: De Nederlandse stoomlocomotieven. Uitg. De Alk, Alkmaar, 2005. .
 A. Weijts: Tussen vuur en stoom. Uitg. Europese Bibliotheek, Zaltbommel, 2001. .
 N.J. van Wijck Jurriaanse: Stoomlocomotieven van de Nederlandse Spoorwegen. UItg. Wyt, Rotterdam, 1972. 

Steam locomotives of the Netherlands
Rolling stock of the Netherlands
Steam locomotives of Switzerland
4-6-0 locomotives
SLM locomotives